Dharma Vish is an Indian music composer, music producer, and songwriter. He has produced music for Indian films in Hindi, Tamil, Kannada and Telugu, and has also composed the score for the film Raagdesh and Yaara

Filmography

External links
Dharma Vish turns audio owner

References

Kannada film score composers
Musicians from Bangalore
Year of birth missing (living people)